Rahma Ben Ali (born 15 September 1993) is a Tunisian taekwondo athlete.

She represented Tunisia at the 2016 Summer Olympics in Rio de Janeiro, in the women's 57 kg.

References

External links
 

1993 births
Living people
Tunisian female taekwondo practitioners
Olympic taekwondo practitioners of Tunisia
Taekwondo practitioners at the 2016 Summer Olympics
Taekwondo practitioners at the 2010 Summer Youth Olympics
African Games bronze medalists for Tunisia
African Games medalists in taekwondo
Competitors at the 2015 African Games
African Taekwondo Championships medalists
21st-century Tunisian women